Dorcus Acen also known as Dorcas Acen is a Ugandan politician and Alebtong District Women's Representative in the eleventh Parliament of Uganda. She stood as the Alebtong District Women's Representative in the tenth Parliament of Uganda as an independent politician however she lost to Christine Acen attached to  the National Resistance Movement. Christine Acen was the elected woman MP for Alebtong in the 2016. Christine completed Senior Six and started running her business.

In the 2021 elections, Dorcus Acen is affiliated to the National Resistance Movement as a ruling political party. During her campaigning period, she donated two ambulances  to her home district to help with managing referral cases in the district and boost its rapid response to COVID-19 pandemic. She also donated posho and beans to the vulnerable people in the district whose means of livelihood have been affected by the extended lockdown and other presidential measures aimed at managing COVID-19, countrywide. In the 2021 Uganda general elections, Acen was elected as the women representative for  Alebtong District In the eleventh parliament, she serves on the  Committee on Gender, Labour and Social Development.

Career 
She worked at GBV Prevention Network as the focal person for Sexual violence and VAW in emergencies. In 2018, she worked as the Gender and Protection Adviser at CARE International in South Sudan, where she is responsible for the overall direction of the Gender and Protection programme portfolio.

See also 

 List of members of the eleventh Parliament of Uganda
National Resistance Movement.
 Parliament of Uganda.
 Alebtong District
 Member of Parliament
 Independent politician

External links 

 Website of the Parliament of Uganda.
 Dorcus Acen on Linkedin
 Dorcus Acen on Facebook
 Acen Dorcus on Twitter
 Lango Members of Parliament 2021-2026.
 GBV Sub cluster Focal Person for GBV mainstreaming in different clusters

References 

Living people
People from Alebtong District
Independent politicians
National Resistance Movement politicians
Members of the Parliament of Uganda
Women members of the Parliament of Uganda
Ugandan activists
Ugandan women's rights activists
Year of birth missing (living people)
21st-century Ugandan politicians
21st-century Ugandan women politicians